Žygimantas is a Lithuanian masculine given name, which is a variant of Sigismund, a German name meaning "protection through victory." Notable people with the name include:

Žygimantas II of Lithuania (1467–1548), King of Poland and Grand Duke of Lithuania 
Žygimantas Augustas (1520–1572), King of Poland and Grand Duke of Lithuania
Žygimantas Janavičius (born 1989), Lithuanian basketball player
Žygimantas Jonušas (born 1982), Lithuanian basketball player
Žygimantas Kęstutaitis (1365–1440), Grand Duke of Lithuania
Žygimantas Skučas (born 1992), Lithuanian basketball player 
Žygimantas Stanulis (born 1993), Lithuanian weightlifter

See also
Sigismund

Lithuanian masculine given names